Loxosomatidae is a family of Entoprocta belonging to the order Coloniales.

Genera:
 Loxocorone  Iseto, 2002
 Loxomespilon  Bobin & Prenant, 1953
 Loxomitra  Nielsen, 1964
 Loxosoma  Keferstein, 1862
 Loxosomella  Mortensen, 1911

References

Entoprocta